The  is a railway line in Japan, which connects Nagoya Station with JR Namba Station in Osaka. It is jointly run by the Central Japan Railway Company (JR Central) and West Japan Railway Company (JR West), with the boundary between both companies being located at Kameyama Station in Kameyama, Mie.

The section from Kamo Station west to JR Namba Station is electrified and a part of the JR West "Urban Network", and is nicknamed the Yamatoji Line. The JR Central section from Nagoya to Kameyama is also electrified.

Despite its name, for much of its length it is a very local line with mainly single track sections and no regular express services. The line was originally built in the 1890s by Kansai Railway (later under the Japanese Government Railways and Japanese National Railways) as an alternate route from south Osaka to Nara and Nagoya, but competition from the Kintetsu lines and declining ridership forced the line to operationally become two electric suburban lines for Osaka and Nagoya respectively, with a less-used unelectrified rural section in the middle.

History
The Osaka Railway Co. opened the Minatomachi (now JR Namba) to Nara section between 1889 and 1892. The company merged with the Kansai Railway Co. in 1900.

The Nara Railway Co. opened the Nara to Kizu section in 1896. It merged with the Kansai Railway Co. in 1905.

The Kansai Railway Co. opened the Nagoya to Kizu section between 1890 and 1897, completing the line. The company was nationalised in 1907.

Duplication
The Minatomachi to Tennoji section was duplicated in 1903 and extended to Kashiwara in 1908. The Nara to Kizu section was duplicated in 1914, and the Kashiwara to Nara section between 1923 and 1926. In 1944 the Oji to Nara section was returned to single track and the materials recycled for the Japanese war effort. The section was re-duplicated in 1961.

The Tomita to Kuwana section (except for the bridge over the Inabe River) was duplicated in 1973, and the Kuwana to Yatomi section between 1977 and 1980. The Yokkaichi to Tomidahama section was duplicated in 1993.

Electrification
The Minatomachi to Nara section was electrified in 1973, extended to Kizu in 1984, and to Kamo in 1988.

The Nagoya - Hatta section was electrified in 1979, and extended to Kameyama in 1982.

Other matters of note
CTC signalling was commissioned between Kizu and Kameyama in 1983, and extended to Nagoya in 2001.

Freight services ceased in 1987, and in 1994 Minatomachi Station was renamed  to coincide with the opening of the  Kansai Airport Line to Kansai Airport. In 1996 Namba Station and the approach line were relocated underground to eliminate a number of level crossings. There are plans to extend the line from Namba to Osaka Station, with construction to begin within the next few years. (See Naniwasuji Line for information.)

Former connecting lines
 Kamo Station - In 1898 the Kansai Railway Co. opened an 8 km branch to a station beside the Daibutsu (Great Buddha), and in 1899 extended the line 2 km to Nara. Following the nationalisation of the Kansai Railway Co. in 1907, the 10 km line was closed.
 Horyuji Station - The 4 km 1435mm gauge Kintetsu line to Hirahata operated between 1915 and 1945.
 Kyuhoji Station - A branchline to serve the Taisho airfield opened in 1942, and was extended to Sugimotocho Station on the Hanwa Line in 1952 to provide an electrified (1500 V DC) freight bypass between Wakayama and Nagoya. Passenger services were introduced in 1965 but ceased two years later, and the line closed in 2009 after being out of service for five years.
 Tennoji Station - The 2.4 km Nankai line to Tengachaya, electrified at 1500 V DC, operated between 1901 and 1993.

Stations

JR Central (Nagoya–Kameyama)
S: Trains stop
 |: Trains pass
Local trains stop at all stations.

JR West (Kameyama–Kamo)
All stations between Kameyama and Kamo featured passing double tracks.

JR West (Kamo–JR Namba)
See the Yamatoji Line article for the train types and stopping patterns on this section.
Stations on this section
 -  -  -  -  -  -  -  -  -  -  -  -  -  -  -  -  -  -  -  -  -

Rolling stock

JR Central

EMU
 211 series
 313 series

DMU
 KiHa 75 series
 KiHa 85 series
 Ise Railway Ise type III

JR West

EMU

DMU
 KiHa 120 series

Former
 101 series
 113 series
 165 series
 213-5000 series
 KiHa 17
 KiHa 35
 KiHa 50
 KiHa 51
 KiHa 55
 KiHa 58
 KiHa 65
 KiHa 81
 KiHa 82
 Ise Railway Ise I
 Ise Railway Ise II

In popular culture
The Kansai Main Line is the home course of Takumi Fujiwara in Densha de D, a parody of Initial D where the main characters race with trains instead of cars.

References

 
Rail transport in Aichi Prefecture
Rail transport in Mie Prefecture
Rail transport in Kyoto Prefecture
Rail transport in Nara Prefecture
Rail transport in Osaka Prefecture
Lines of West Japan Railway Company
Lines of Central Japan Railway Company
Railway lines opened in 1889
1067 mm gauge railways in Japan